The Doodle Bug was a motor scooter built from 1946 to 1948 by the Beam Manufacturing Company of Webster City, Iowa, US. They were sold through the Gambles store chain to compete against Cushman scooters being sold under the  Allstate brand by Sears. Gambles sold the Doodle Bug under the "Hiawatha" name.

Doodle Bugs were powered by 1½ hp engines from Briggs & Stratton or Clinton.  The Doodle Bug Standard Model B was the only Doodle Bug series powered by Clinton engines; one thousand or less of these were built, all during the first production run of ten thousand scooters.  All other Doodle Bug scooters, including the Standard Model A that was produced alongside the Model B during the first production run, used variants of the Briggs & Stratton NP engine. Four production runs of ten thousand scooters each were built.

An annual reunion of Doodle Bug owners and restorers is held in Webster City.

in 2010 baja motorsports created the "dirt bug" a 2 hp off road version of the doodle bug scooter it was until april 23 2016 dirt bugs were recalled due to some parts failing like clutch problems or the motor pulley kept failing for its debut in 2010 it lasted for 5 yrs quads and dirtbikes would be in the shop 2 times by then to keep up to date but with minibikes you can replace the engine with another instead of paying 6,000$ for a brand new machine but notice the parts you would have to replace every two yrs of use

References

External links
 Doodle Bug Scooter basic description with good pic
 Doodle Bug Club of America based in Webster City, Iowa

Motor scooters